Animal advocacy may refer to:

Animal protectionism, the view favors incremental change in pursuit of non-human animal interests
Animal rights, the idea that non-human animals are entitled to the possession of their own lives
Animal rights movement, advocacy for the idea of animal rights
Animal welfare, support for the well-being of animals

See also
List of animal advocacy parties
List of animal rights advocates
List of animal welfare groups